Macroglossum amoenum is a moth of the  family Sphingidae. It is known from South-East Asia, including Indonesia and Malaysia.

References

Macroglossum
Moths described in 1903